In hyperbolic geometry, the order-4 dodecahedral honeycomb is one of four compact regular space-filling tessellations (or honeycombs) of hyperbolic 3-space. With Schläfli symbol  it has four dodecahedra around each edge, and 8 dodecahedra around each vertex in an octahedral arrangement. Its vertices are constructed from 3 orthogonal axes. Its dual is the order-5 cubic honeycomb.

Description
The dihedral angle of a regular dodecahedron is ~116.6°, so it is impossible to fit 4 of them on an edge in Euclidean 3-space. However in hyperbolic space a properly-scaled regular dodecahedron can be scaled so that its dihedral angles are reduced to 90 degrees, and then four fit exactly on every edge.

Symmetry 
It has a half symmetry construction, {5,31,1}, with two types (colors) of dodecahedra in the Wythoff construction.  ↔ .

Images 

A view of the order-4 dodecahedral honeycomb under the Beltrami-Klein model

Related polytopes and honeycombs 
There are four regular compact honeycombs in 3D hyperbolic space:

There are fifteen uniform honeycombs in the [5,3,4] Coxeter group family, including this regular form. 

There are eleven uniform honeycombs in the bifurcating [5,31,1] Coxeter group family, including this honeycomb in its alternated form. 
This construction can be represented by alternation (checkerboard) with two colors of dodecahedral cells.

This honeycomb is also related to the 16-cell, cubic honeycomb, and order-4 hexagonal tiling honeycomb all which have octahedral vertex figures:

This honeycomb is a part of a sequence of polychora and honeycombs with dodecahedral cells:

Rectified order-4 dodecahedral honeycomb 

The rectified order-4 dodecahedral honeycomb, has alternating octahedron and icosidodecahedron cells, with a square prism vertex figure.

Related honeycombs
There are four rectified compact regular honeycombs:

Truncated order-4 dodecahedral honeycomb 

The truncated order-4 dodecahedral honeycomb, has octahedron and truncated dodecahedron cells, with a square pyramid vertex figure.

It can be seen as analogous to the 2D hyperbolic truncated order-4 pentagonal tiling, t{5,4} with truncated pentagon and square faces:

Related honeycombs

Bitruncated order-4 dodecahedral honeycomb 

The bitruncated order-4 dodecahedral honeycomb, or bitruncated order-5 cubic honeycomb, has truncated octahedron and truncated icosahedron cells, with a digonal disphenoid vertex figure.

Related honeycombs

Cantellated order-4 dodecahedral honeycomb 

The cantellated order-4 dodecahedral honeycomb, has rhombicosidodecahedron, cuboctahedron, and cube cells, with a wedge vertex figure.

Related honeycombs

Cantitruncated order-4 dodecahedral honeycomb 

The cantitruncated order-4 dodecahedral honeycomb, has truncated icosidodecahedron, truncated octahedron, and cube cells, with a mirrored sphenoid vertex figure.

Related honeycombs

Runcinated order-4 dodecahedral honeycomb 

The runcinated order-4 dodecahedral honeycomb is the same as the runcinated order-5 cubic honeycomb.

Runcitruncated order-4 dodecahedral honeycomb 

The runcitruncated order-4 dodecahedral honeycomb, has truncated dodecahedron, rhombicuboctahedron, decagonal prism, and cube cells, with an isosceles-trapezoidal pyramid vertex figure.

Related honeycombs

Runcicantellated order-4 dodecahedral honeycomb 

The runcicantellated order-4 dodecahedral honeycomb is the same as the runcitruncated order-5 cubic honeycomb.

Omnitruncated order-4 dodecahedral honeycomb 

The omnitruncated order-4 dodecahedral honeycomb is the same as the omnitruncated order-5 cubic honeycomb.

See also 
 Convex uniform honeycombs in hyperbolic space
 Regular tessellations of hyperbolic 3-space
 Poincaré homology sphere Poincaré dodecahedral space
 Seifert–Weber space Seifert–Weber dodecahedral space

References 
Coxeter, Regular Polytopes, 3rd. ed., Dover Publications, 1973. . (Tables I and II: Regular polytopes and honeycombs, pp. 294–296)
Coxeter, The Beauty of Geometry: Twelve Essays, Dover Publications, 1999  (Chapter 10: Regular honeycombs in hyperbolic space, Summary tables II,III,IV,V, p212-213)
 Jeffrey R. Weeks The Shape of Space, 2nd edition  (Chapter 16-17: Geometries on Three-manifolds I,II)
 Norman Johnson Uniform Polytopes, Manuscript
 N.W. Johnson: The Theory of Uniform Polytopes and Honeycombs, Ph.D. Dissertation, University of Toronto, 1966 
 N.W. Johnson: Geometries and Transformations, (2018) Chapter 13: Hyperbolic Coxeter groups

Honeycombs (geometry)